Jack Doherty may refer to:
Jack Doherty (footballer, born 1915) (1915–1990), Australian rules footballer for Melbourne and South Adelaide
Jack Doherty (footballer, born 1921) (1921–1998), Australian rules footballer for North Melbourne
Jack Doherty (potter) (born 1948), Northern Irish studio potter and author
John Doherty (Irish footballer) (born 1908, also known as Jack "Dot" Doherty), Northern Irish footballer

See also
John Doherty (disambiguation)
Jock Doherty (1894–1957), Australian rules footballer for South Melbourne and North Melbourne